Mary Haskell may refer to:
 Mary Haskell (missionary) (1869–1953), American congregationalist missionary
 Mary Haskell (educator) (1873–1964), American educator